The year 1685 in science and technology involved some significant events.

Mathematics
 Adam Adamandy Kochański publishes an approximation for squaring the circle.

Physiology and medicine
 Charles Allen publishes the first book in English on dentistry, The Operator for the Teeth.
 Govert Bidloo publishes an atlas of human anatomy, Ontleding des menschelyken lichaams, with plates by Gerard de Lairesse.

Technology
 Menno van Coehoorn publishes his principal treatise on fortification, Nieuwe Vestingbouw op een natte of lage horisont, in Leeuwarden.

Births
 August 18 – Brook Taylor, English mathematician (died 1731)
 November 17 – Pierre Gaultier de Varennes et de la Vérendrye, French Canadian explorer (died 1749)

Deaths
 February 2 – Pierre Bourdelot, French physician, anatomist, freethinker, abbé and libertine (born 1610)
 November 23 – Bernard de Gomme, military engineer in England (born 1620)
 December 12 – John Pell, English mathematician (born 1610)

References

 
17th century in science
1680s in science